The sixteenth season of The Bachelorette features Clare Crawley, a 39-year-old hairstylist from Sacramento, California, and Tayshia Adams, a 29-year-old phlebotomist from Corona del Mar, California. The season was originally set to premiere on May 18, 2020, however the COVID-19 pandemic forced production to postpone indefinitely, it premiered on October 13, 2020. The season also aired on Tuesday nights instead of its regular Monday night timeslot.

Crawley was the runner-up on the 18th season of The Bachelor featuring Juan Pablo Galavis. She also made appearances on seasons one and two of Bachelor in Paradise, and on Bachelor Winter Games. At 39, Crawley is the oldest Bachelorette in the show's history; the previous oldest Bachelorette was Rachel Lindsay, who was 32 on her season. Due to the pandemic, the entire season was filmed at La Quinta Resort & Club in La Quinta, California. Crawley departed the show in episode 4 after choosing 31-year-old Dale Moss as her fiancé. Moss became the first African American winner in the franchise's history. The couple broke up on January 19, 2021. They got back together soon after, but broke up for good on September 27, 2021.

Adams finished in third place on the 23rd season of The Bachelor featuring Colton Underwood. She also made an appearance on season 6 of Bachelor in Paradise. The season concluded on December 22, 2020, with Adams accepting a proposal from 36-year-old addiction specialist Zac Clark. They ended their engagement on November 22, 2021.

Production

Casting and contestants
Clare Crawley was named as the Bachelorette on Good Morning America on March 2, 2020. Some of the other women who were considered for the role include season 22's Tia Booth and Kendall Long, season 23's Tayshia Adams and Katie Morton, previous Bachelorette Hannah Brown, and season 24's Kelsey Weier. Adams would eventually take the role after Crawley's dismissal from the show (see below).

Notable contestants for this season include football players Dale Moss, Jason Foster and Uzoma Nwachukwu; and Tyler Smith, who is the brother of country music singer Granger Smith.

Filming and development

For the first time since the second season of The Bachelorette in 2004, the dates and travel would have to take place entirely within the United States because of growing concerns about the COVID-19 due to the ongoing pandemic. Filming was scheduled to begin on March 13, 2020 at the traditional Villa de La Vina mansion in Agoura Hills, California and had been planned to conclude in mid-May in time for the original premiere date of May 18, but with the aforementioned pandemic growing rapidly, the season was forced to suspend production and filming was postponed to a later date. The initial destinations for the season including visits to Chattanooga (Tennessee), Reykjavík (Iceland), Rome (Italy) and Hvar (Croatia), but were called off by the production crew due to factors of the worsening outbreak, omitting international travel. Iceland and Croatia would eventually be revisited in the twenty-sixth season of The Bachelor.

On June 17, 2020, it was announced that the season was scheduled to premiere in fall 2020 as COVID viral transmission cases had gradually started to decline. The following day, it was announced that production was rescheduled to July, with the show becoming the first non-scripted American television program to begin production since the start of the pandemic. Production decided to change into an alternative single location to a lockdown-styled theme at La Quinta Resort & Club in La Quinta, California, a format which is similar to Big Brother franchise. It began in early July where contestants and crew being isolated with a two-week quarantine period before filming and regular COVID-19 testing is required to have their temperature checked, being resulted all of the contestants and crew were tested negative. Contestants were to have tested positive from COVID-19 that is either a subject of not being permitted on the show or having to wait an indefinite delay to join the cast. Due to enforced quarantine restrictions, all of the dates would be taking place entirely at the resort limits to reduce public interactions. This was for the first time since season eight being not filmed at Villa de La Vina mansion normally in the first few weeks of the competition. On August 27, the season announced to premiere on October 13, marking the first season that did not premiere in the usual May start since the series returned in 2008.

During filming in August 2020, host Chris Harrison had to go into a two-week quarantine after taking time to help his son move into his dorm at Texas Christian University. Season twelve Bachelorette JoJo Fletcher temporarily took over hosting duties during that period.

Due to the concerns surrounding in the current pandemic, the typical Men Tell All conducted in a remote format with Harrison hosting from Nemacolin Woodlands Resort in Farmington, Pennsylvania via video chatting and the eliminated contestants had invited at a secluded private house in La Quinta Resort, the typical After the Final Rose special did not take place.

Lead replacement
Crawley left the show in the fourth episode after she became engaged to Dale Moss. Tayshia Adams replaced Crawley as the Bachelorette, and the season proceeded. Given the unique parameters of this season due to the pandemic, Adams' season did not "restart" upon her arrival. Rather, all of the remaining contestants continued from this season plus an additional four men stayed to win over Adams' heart.

Contestants

32 original potential contestants were revealed on March 11, 2020. Host Chris Harrison later revealed that they would likely be recasting the season due to the filming delay.

An updated cast list containing 42 potential contestants was released on July 15, 2020, including 17 from the original potential cast list of March 2020.

Four of the intended 32 original contestants, Matt James, was instead recast as the lead for season 25 of The Bachelor – becoming the first male African American lead and the second African American in the history of the franchise, following Rachel Lindsay from season 13 of The Bachelorette before Adams was named as the Bachelorette. Greg Grippo and Karl Smith were then recast for the following season the following year, and James Clarke was then recast for season 19 instead two years later.

The final cast list of 31 men was announced on September 29, 2020. Four new contestants arrived in the fifth episode when Adams became the Bachelorette, bringing a total number of contestants to 35.

Future appearances

The Bachelorette
Adams was named as the interim host for The Bachelorette from the subsequent season 17 and preceding season 18 alongside season 11 bachelorette Kaitlyn Bristowe, replaced Chris Harrison. Blake Moynes returned as a contestant on season 17 of The Bachelorette. He received the final rose and was engaged to Bachelorette lead Katie Thurston. The two announced that they ended their engagement on Oct. 25.

Bachelor in Paradise
Brendan Morais, Ivan Hall, Kenny Braasch, Noah Erb, Riley Christian, Chasen Nick, Chris Conran, Blake Monar, Joe Park, Demar Jackson, and Ed Waisbrot returned for season 7 of Bachelor in Paradise. Nick was eliminated during Week 2. Conran and Morais quit week 3. Hall quit week 4. Monar, Park, and Jackson were eliminated during week 4. Erb split from Abigail Heringer in week 5, although they've gotten back together. Waisbrot split from Mykenna Dorn week 6. Braasch and Christian both got engaged week 6 to Mari Pepin and Maurissa Gunn, respectively.

Call-out order

 The contestant received the first impression rose
 The contestant received a rose during a date
 The contestant received a rose during the cocktail party
 The contestant was eliminated 
 The contestant was still in the competition and moved on for a different bachelorette
 The contestant was eliminated during a date 
 The contestant was eliminated outside the rose ceremony 
 The contestant moved on to the next week by default
 The contestant quit the competition 
 The contestant won the competition

Episodes

Controversy and criticism
During a group date on Week 2, 10 of the men played a game of strip dodgeball and during each round, the contestants were asked to remove a layer of clothing. This date was met with widespread controversy and criticism from fans and alumni alike citing a "double standard".

J.P. Rosenbaum, winner of season 7 of The Bachelorette, wrote on Twitter, "I realize this 'date' is gonna have a lot of critics, but can you imagine the flak the show would get if this was [The Bachelor] and the girls were stripping down to their underwear?" Bachelor franchise podcast host Juliet Litman stated, "If it was women in that position, it would be completely unacceptable, absolutely scandalous and there would be this huge outcry. The double standard of objectifying men's' bodies like that and asking men to be in that position really bothered me because I would not accept it for women." Former Bachelor Ben Higgins stated that, "If this was a Bachelor season, no way this happens, no way they get away with it, no way it's appropriate, no way this just becomes a weekly topic. I think the show is super smart. They knew this wouldn't shut down the show, but it's pushing the envelope a little bit here." Contestant Yosef Aborady admitted that if he was invited to the group date, he would not have played the dodgeball game, stating, "Number one value is to have respect for myself and my daughter. I don't want her turning on the TV and seeing dad's ass." Aborady ended up being sent home by Crawley later that week due to an argument with her concerning the appropriateness of that date. Many fans expressed disgust with the date on social media.

Notes

References

External links

The Bachelorette (American TV series) seasons
Television productions suspended due to the COVID-19 pandemic
2020 American television seasons
Television shows filmed in California